Desmoxytes, whose species are commonly known as the dragon millipedes, is a genus of millipedes of the family Paradoxosomatidae found in Southeast Asia. The genus was described by Ralph Vary Chamberlin in 1923, and reviewed by Sergei Golovatch and Henrik Enghoff in 1994. At least 18 species are known from to Malaysia, Myanmar, and Thailand. One species, D. planata, has also been observed in Sri Lanka, the Andaman Islands, Seychelles, Java, Great Coco Island, and Fiji; however, this species has expanded its range by being transported through human activity. Several species have only recently been discovered, and some have yet to be officially described.

Generally, species in this genus are striking in coloration and spiny, although several species are cave-dwelling, and show troglomorphic characteristics, such as pale brownish coloration and long, narrow spines. This genus is unique for its sculptured, ornamented dorsum, and elaborate paranota. Species in this genus also have the ability to produce hydrogen cyanide to ward off predators, which can give the dragon millipedes an almond-like smell.

Species
Other than D. planata, each species of dragon millipede is known primarily from only one or a few locations in their country of origin. Additionally, one species from Australia, Desmoxytoides hasenpuschorum, is extremely similar to Desmoxytes, but has been split into its own monotypic genus;  speculation exists, even by the genus authority for Desmoxytoides, that this split is not necessary. In 2018, the genus Hylomus was reinstated and 33 Desmoxytes species were reassigned to this genus.

References

Polydesmida
 
Millipede genera
Millipedes of Asia
Cave millipedes
Taxa named by Ralph Vary Chamberlin